Christos Ioannidis (born 28 July 2004) is a Greek professional footballer who plays as a midfielder for Super League club Ionikos.

References

2004 births
Living people
Greek footballers
Super League Greece 2 players
Super League Greece players
Trikala F.C. players
Ionikos F.C. players
Association football midfielders
Footballers from Katerini